Fujian Renmin Guangbo Diantai, translated as "Fujian People's Broadcasting Station", is a radio station group from Fujian, China.  It is part of the Fujian Radio Film and TV Group conglomerate.

See also
 Fujian Radio Film and TV Group

Sources
 http://www.findarticles.com/p/articles/mi_hb3270/is_200403/ai_n7968067

Radio stations in China
Mass media in Fujian
Companies based in Fuzhou